Caecilia is a genus of amphibians in the family Caeciliidae.

Species

References 

 
Amphibian genera
Taxa named by Carl Linnaeus